Evgeny Brazhnik ([sometimes anglicised as Eugene Brazhnik]) is a Russian conductor and both USSR State Prize and People's Artist of Russia recipient.

Biography
Brazhnik got his education at both Saint Petersburg and Ural conservatories and later performed over 50 operas in such countries as China, Czech Republic,  France, Germany, Israel, Poland, South Korea, Spain, and the United States. One of his first performances was The Legend of the Invisible City of Kitezh and the Maiden Fevroniya which he was a conductor of at the time but became known more for his conducting of David Lloyd-Jones' version of Boris Godunov which was performed at the Yekaterinburg Opera for the first time in Russian history. Since 1999 he works for the Helikon Opera and by 2012 became the Golden Mask recipient for his conducting of The Tales of Hoffmann which was performed in Moscow's Stanislavski and Nemirovich-Danchenko Moscow Academic Music Theatre.

References

Living people
Recipients of the USSR State Prize
People's Artists of Russia
Year of birth missing (living people)
21st-century Russian conductors (music)
Russian male conductors (music)
21st-century Russian male musicians